Arentius (Portuguese: Arâncio) and Arentia (Portuguese: Arância) are considered to be a pair of indigenous deities that belong to the Lusitanian pantheon, and attested mainly in epigraphy.

Epigraphy
Scholars report at least 13 epigraphies (14 inscriptions, as of 2022) attesting either Arentius or Arentia, mostly located in central-eastern Lusitania, and, according to scholar Juan Olivares Pedreño, "well represented" in Egitania.

Both deities are attested either in isolation, or, rarely, as a pair. Olivares Pedreño suggested that their attestation as a pair seems to hark back to similar votive altars of a male and female divine couple in Celtic areas.

The pair is also alternatively attested as Arantius and Arantia, although this occurrence is rare.

In two inscriptions from Beira Baixa, Arentius is attested as Arantio Tanginiciaeco and as Arentio Cronisensi.

Etymology
Francisco Marco Simón suggested that the pair were aquatic deities, following Hans Krahe's study on Old European hydronymy that associates the stem *ar- with the names of bodies of water.

Spanish historian  seems to support this interpretation. Also, according to Blazquez, Blanca María Prósper believes that Arantio (another attested name for Arentius) refers to a river deity.

See also
 Castro culture
 Celtic mythology
 Lusitanian language
 National Archaeology Museum (Portugal)
 Pre-Roman peoples of the Iberian Peninsula
 Proto-Indo-European mythology
 Roman mythology

References

Bibliography 

 .
 
 .
 .
 .
 .
 .
 Redentor, Armando (2008). “Panorama da Teonímia Pré-romana em Trás-os-montes Oriental”. In: Divindades indígenas em análise. Coord. José d’ Encarnação. Coimbra e Porto: Centro de Estudos Arqueológicos, Universidade de Coimbra, Universidade do Porto, pp. 105-124.
 .

Lusitanian goddesses
Lusitanian gods